Ameixial is a Portuguese freguesia ("civil parish"), in the municipality of Loulé. The population in 2011 was 439, in an area of 123.85 km². It has an altitude of 439 m (1443 ft).

References

Freguesias of Loulé